Halbi  (also Bastari, Halba, Halvas, Halabi, Halvi) is an Eastern Indo-Aryan language, transitional between Odia and Marathi. It is spoken by at least 766,297 people across the central part of India. 

The Mehari (or Mahari) dialect is mutually intelligible with the other dialects only with difficulty. There are an estimated 200,000 second-language speakers (as of 2001). In Chhattisgarh educated people are fluent in Hindi. Some first language speakers use  Bhatri as second language.

Halbi is often used as a trade language, but there is a low literacy rate. It is written in the Odia and Devanagari scripts. It uses SOV word order (subject-object-verb), makes strong use of affixes, and places adjectives before nouns.

Phonology

Vowels 
Halbi has 6 vowels: /a, e, ɘ, i, o, u/. All vowels show contrastive vowel nasalization.

Consonants

References

Eastern Indo-Aryan languages
Languages of India